Pingtan, also known as Suzhou pingtan, is a regional variety of quyi and a musical/oral performance art form popular in southern Jiangsu, northern Zhejiang, and Shanghai (the Jiangnan region of China). It originated in the city of Suzhou. It is a combination of the Chinese narrative musical traditions pinghua and tanci. It dates back to Song dynasty and is influenced by Wuyue culture.

Created by the work of the Pingtan artists, this art form enjoys great popularity in Jiangnan. The long history has also laid a solid foundation for its development. Its contents are rich, though the form is simple. "story telling, joke cracking, music playing and aria singing"  are the performing techniques, while "reasoning, tastes, unexpectedness, interest and minuteness" are the artistic features. Although it originated in Suzhou, Pingtan flourished in Shanghai with the development of commerce and culture at the turn of the 19th century and the 20th century. After that, Pingtan became a new form of performance by innovating and carrying on the tradition.

Origin and development
It originated in Suzhou about four hundred years ago. From the middle of the 19th century to the beginning of the 20th century, it was performed in Shanghai. At that time, Shanghai was one of the five treaty ports. Shanghai's economy was booming and various cultures arrived there. Pingtan absorbed some elements from various cultures and was well developed under the circumstances. The rise of records and radio stations also played an important role in popularizing Pingtan art. Another positive factor was the expansion of performing halls, which were decorated well and spacious. As a result, people like writers, painters, professors gradually became loyal fans. After the founding of People's Republic of China, 18 performers organized Shanghai People's Pingtan Troupe, which was the first official troupe. Based on traditional long story-telling, shorter and medium-sized stories were created, reflecting modern life. The form of performance is not limited in Shuchang, which was the traditional performing stage, however, in 1961 Pingtan concert was held which attracted nearly one thousand people to watch in each performance. While its traditional repertoire was banned during the Cultural Revolution, Pingtan still enjoyed a special status as a preferred medium for singing poems by Mao Zedong, making Pingtan known and appreciated throughout China, despite the dialectal barrier. Since the late 1970s, the traditional repertoire has been revived. The old artists undertook the task of passing the tradition on to the new generation. Pingtan is popularized by radio, television and Internet. Meanwhile, it faces challenges as a result of the popular entertainment industry.

Performance

Props
The actors sing, accompanied by musical instruments such as a small sanxian or pipa.
Pingtan artists also use fans, gavels and handkerchieves as performance props. Players can display different roles' characteristics and identities by using fans. Fans can also be used as symbolic props to represent knives, guns, swords or whips. Gavels are usually made of jade, Dysoxylum spp or crystal and about 3 cm in length and 1 cm in width. When struck, they make a clear sound. They are used to make all kinds of sounds and atmosphere. Actors usually use white handkerchieves, while actresses choose different colors and materials according to the plot.

Forms
Pingtan contains talking, joking, instrument-playing, singing and acting. Suzhou Pingtan which involves singing and storytelling, is performed solo, in duet or as a trio. The small three-stringed plucked instrument and Pipa (lute) are used as accompaniment. The Ban, or wooden clappers, produce various styles of tone and melody. Pingtan has absorbed popular folk tunes. The special art Pintan performance is concentrated on the five words, joking, instrument-playing, singing and acting. Talking uses authentic and skilled Suzhou dialect to narrate stories and deduce characters. Narration and speaking are two forms of talking. Joking is the funny part of Pintan, which arises audience's attention and interests. Instrument-playing is used to assist singing in order to make it more musical and filled with strong sense of rhythm.

Styles
There are many different performance styles concerning Pingtan. It is divided into the Chen Yuquan, Ma Rufei and Yu Xiushan Schools called Chen Diao, Ma Diao, Yu Diao. Over about a century, new styles were formed which inherited the legacy of the three schools. Liu Tianyun and Yang Zhenxiong inherited the Chen School, and Xia Hesheng and Zhu Huizhen inherited the Yu School. The Ma School exerted the greatest impact on posterity, with successors who formed schools of their own, such as Xue Xiaoqing Diao(tone), Shen Jianan Diao and Qin Diao(developed by Zhu Xueqin on the basis of Xue Diao). Zhou Yuquan developed into a school on the basis of Ma Diao, while Jiang Yuequan developed into a school on the basis of Zhou Diao. Due to this development, Suzhou Pingtan has a great diversity of styles in singing and storytelling.

Features
Simply, Pingtan is a kind of talking and singing art which uses Wu dialect to tell stories.
Pingtan is intended to tell stories, especially long stories. Pingtan performers always separate a long story into several parts. In this way, they could form their own style to form and describe plots. For instance, surrounding one or two complex plots to tell stories, making some involvements, and repeating some important plots are common ways.
Pingtan is a verbal literary artform which has a lot of oral features. As a kind of language art, it will use words to create imaginative images. The performers have to use vivid words which can make the audience imagine the scenes.
Pingtan combines storytelling and singing, so it can express feelings more strongly and it has local styles. It will cover some culture phenomenon of daily life in local area.

Artistic characteristics
Pingtan forms its own artistic characteristics of reasoning, taste, unexpectedness, interest and minuteness. Reasoning is not the boring preachment given by the performers. On the contrary, it tends to disclose objective laws and essence of real life by means of shaping vivid characters. And the development of the personalities of characters correspond to their circumstances. People usually judge the authenticity of what they heard according to their own experiences. If audience find the contents go against objective laws or have no references, it will be hard to arouse people's interests and bring their imagination. In addition, there is no doubt that Pingtan may lose the impact of arts. Taste means the feelings of artistic beauty. It results from the expression of artistic characteristics. At the same time, taste is a kind of emotional infection. Thus storytellers ought to skillfully master a variety of skills to ensure the storytelling filled with taste. Fully studying the chance of the development of things can receive unexpectedness. On account of the strong narrative description of characters and plots, Pingtan needs the effect of the twists of the plot structure. Interest reveals the performers attach much importance to the recreational effect of Pingtan. Performers' ultimate goal is to cater to the interests of the public. When it comes to minuteness, it also arises from the real life. The lively and true descriptions of details depend on the performers' observation and experiences.

Famous artists
Jiang Yuequan
Chen Yuqian
Yao Yinmei
Yang Zhengxiong
Zhou Yuquan
Shen Jian'an
Xue Xiaoqin
Yang Xiaoting
Ma Rufei

Notable works

Long story-telling
Butterfly lovers
Diao Chan
 Fate in Tears and Laughter, Tixiao Yinyuan
Jiang Jie
Romance of the Western Chamber

Medium-length stories
The Injustice to Dou E
Liu Hulan
The White Haired Girl
 Rinchuu

Shorter stories
Liu Hulan Dies A Martyr
Iron Man Wang
Sunday

Comparison with other kinds of quyi
There are also many other kinds of Quyi. Different areas have different history of 'storytelling'—this kind of art. However, they are all combined with local features and mostly performed in dialects. 
Compared with other talking and singing artforms, Pingtan is a kind art which performers will sit and perform. Pinghua just talk and Tanci will talk and sing just like Pingshu in northern areas. Quyi can be divided into several parts according to the contents: story-telling, just joking for fun, singing songs to express feelings. And Pingtan belongs to the first one.

References

Further reading
Qiliang He. Gilded Voices: Economics, Politics, and Storytelling in the Yangzi Delta Since 1949. Leiden: Brill, 2012

Chinese literature
Chinese folk music
Culture in Suzhou
Culture in Shanghai
Chinese storytelling